The 2018–19 North Superleague (known as the McBookie.com North Superleague for sponsorship reasons) was the 18th season of the North Superleague, the top tier of league competition for SJFA North Region member clubs. 

Banks O' Dee were the reigning champions. The winners of this competition are eligible to enter the 2019–20 Scottish Cup at the preliminary round stage.

Teams and locations

The following teams have changed division since the 2017–18 season.

To North Superleague
Promoted from North First Division (East)
 East End
Promoted from North First Division (West)
 Nairn St. Ninian

From North Superleague
Relegated to North First Division
 Banchory St. Ternan
In Abeyance
 Inverness City

League table

Results

References

2018–19 in Scottish football leagues
SJFA North Region Superleague seasons